Color-blind casting is the practice of casting without considering the actor's ethnicity or race. Alternative terms and similar practices include non-traditional casting, integrated casting,  or blind casting, which can involve casting without consideration of skin color, body shape, sex or gender. A representative of the Actors' Equity Association has disputed the use of  "color blind casting", preferring "non-traditional casting". Non-traditional casting "is defined as the casting of ethnic minority actors in roles where race, ethnicity, or gender is not germane". Race-reversed casting is one form of non-traditional casting.

Examples

The Non-Traditional Casting Project
The Non-Traditional Casting Project was founded in 1986 to examine problems of racial discrimination in theatre, film and television. The Actors' Equity Association is a co-founder.

Debate and "color-consciousness"
In the theatre community, there is significant debate over the concept of color-blind casting vs "color-conscious casting".

In 1996, Pulitzer-winning playwright August Wilson used his Princeton University address on black culture in the United States "The Ground on Which I Stand" to attack the notion of color-blind casting.

In 2017, Associate Editor of American Theatre magazine Diep Tran declared "color-conscious" to be a preferable term. "Color-conscious means we're aware of the historic discrimination in the entertainment industry... and we're also aware of what it means to put a body of color onstage.". The idea promotes intentionality and race-conscious affirmative action to avoid racially homogeneous casts, and has been supported widely across the theatre community.

In 2018, the Harvard Journal of Sports & Entertainment Law published the article "There's No Business Like Show Business: Abandoning Color-Blind Casting and Embracing Color-Conscious Casting in American Theatre". The article discussed the implications for US employment law and mooted that color-blind casting has not produced its intended result. "Race is still a determining factor in American society, and it is counterintuitive to argue that problems related to race can be fixed by ignoring race altogether". The Broad Online calls a color-blind casting "a superficial solution to a deeper problem."

Popular shows that employ color-conscious casting include: Hamilton: An American Musical, the BBC's Les Misérables, and the film Mary Queen of Scots (in which the black actor Adrian Lester plays a 16th-century ambassador). In 2017, director Michael Streeter made a color-conscious casting decision for his production of Who's Afraid of Virginia Woolf? - believing "the decision would add depth to the play". Edward Albee's estate denied permission for the production, stating the casting "would fundamentally change the meaning and message of the play".

See also
 Racebending
 Race-reversed casting
 Tokenism
 Whitewashing in film

Notes

References

Further reading
 "Berry is top candidate to play white Democrat", The Guardian, 10 October 2006.
 A. N.  Wilson, "I'm ready for a black Miss Marple", The Telegraph, 21 April 2002.

Race and society
Performing arts
Linguistic controversies
Identity politics
Cultural appropriation
Ethnic and racial stereotypes
History of racism in the cinema of the United States
Casting (performing arts)